is a station on the Yurikamome Line in Kōtō, Tokyo, Japan. It is numbered "U-09". It is named after the adjacent Telecom Center building.

Station layout
The station consists of an elevated island platform.

Platforms

History
Telecom Center Station opened on 1 November 1995.

References

External links
 Official information site

Railway stations in Tokyo
Yurikamome
Railway stations in Japan opened in 1995